Atkinson Francis Gibson (20 November 1763 – 22 January 1829) was a British banker.

Early life
He was born in Saffron Walden, Essex, on 20 November 1763, the son of George Gibson and Elizabeth Robinson.

Career
He ran the Saffron Walden and North Essex Bank.

Personal life

On 1 October 1789 in Dunmow, Essex, he married Elizabeth Wyatt, the daughter of Jabez Wyatt of Saffron Walden.

They had five children:
 Wyatt George Gibson (1790–1862), banker
 Mary Gibson (1791-1839)
 Jabez Gibson (1794-1838), banker
 Ann Gibson (1799-1802)
 Francis Gibson (1805-1858), businessman

He died on 22 January 1829 and was buried at the Friends' Burial Ground, Saffron Walden on 22 January 1829.

Legacy

References

1763 births
1829 deaths
British bankers
British Quakers
Atkinson
People from Saffron Walden